Toucabangou is a village and seat of the commune of Issa Bery in the Cercle of Goundam in the Tombouctou Region of Mali.

References

Populated places in Tombouctou Region